The chiesa di San Salvatore di Ognissanti or more simply chiesa di Ognissanti ("Church of All Saints"), is a Franciscan church located on the piazza of the same name in central Florence, region of Tuscany, Italy. Founded by the lay order of the Umiliati, the church was dedicated to all the saints and martyrs, known and unknown.

It is the burial place of the famous Early Renaissance painter, Sandro Botticelli, as well as Age of Discovery-era explorer Amerigo Vespucci, from whom the name "America" is derived.

History
It was completed originally during the 1250s, but almost completely rebuilt around 1627 in Baroque-style by the architect Bartolomeo Pettirossi. Soon after, a new façade (1637) was erected using designs by Matteo Nigetti, that conserved the glazed terracotta lunette over the doorway, which while resembling the work of Della Robbia, is now attributed to Benedetto Buglioni. Ognissanti was among the first examples of Baroque architecture to penetrate this Renaissance city. Its three reversed orders of pilasters enclose niches and windows with elaborate cornices. To the left of the façade is a campanile of 13th and 14th century construction.

The Umiliati, by the dedication and probity of the lay brothers and sisters, gained a reputation in Florence, and dedicated works of art began to accumulate in their severely simple church. For example, Giotto's celebrated Madonna and Child with angels (c. 1310) was painted for the high altar. Recent cleaning of the Crucifix in the left transept has led this work to be attributed also to Giotto. During the sixteenth century, the Umiliati declined in power, and in 1571 the Franciscan order assumed control of the church, and were able to bring to the church precious relics, such as a robe of St Francis of Assisi.

In the early 17th-century, the interior was remodeled in Baroque style, with the apse rebuilt with a pietre dure high altar and a sotto in su perspective  painting (1770) on the vaulted nave ceiling.  Fifteenth-century frescoes by Domenico Ghirlandaio and Sandro Botticelli were preserved in the nave; Botticelli is buried in the church near his beloved Simonetta Vespucci. Botticelli's fresco of St Augustine in His Study faces across the nave the chapel with Ghirlandaio's St Jerome in His Study; both were executed contemporaneously in 1480.

Ghirlandaio also frescoed a version of the Last Supper in the refectory, now a museum, located between the two cloisters, a work which likely influenced Leonardo da Vinci's later work in Milan.

In the Vespucci chapel, a fresco by Domenico Ghirlandaio with his brother David, depicting the Madonna della Misericordia protecting members of the Vespucci family (c. 1472), is reputed to include the portrait of Amerigo Vespucci as a child. When Amerigo found a bay in the actual Brazil, he named to "San Salvatore di Ognissanti", in Portuguese "San Salvador de Todos os Santos": this is the origin of the name of the city of Salvador and Bahia de Todos os Santos.

Over the door to the sacristy is a crucifix in wood by Veit Stoss.

Notes

References

Citations

Bibliography
 . 
 , republished 1964. 
 .

External links

 
Photos of Ognissanti Church and Last Supper Fresco
The Museums of Florence - Ognissanti - Church and Last Supper of Ghirlandaio
 Chiesa di Ognissanti at GCatholic.org

17th-century Roman Catholic church buildings in Italy
Baroque architecture in Florence
Franciscan churches in Italy
Roman Catholic churches in Florence